Levente (11th century) was a Hungarian noble.

Levente may also refer to:

 Levente, or Liüntika (died before 907), Hungarian chieftain
 Levente (organization), a Hungarian paramilitary youth organization from 1921 to 1945 
 Repülőgépgyár Levente II, a small Hungarian aeroplane from World War II era

See also
 Levent
 Levant (disambiguation)
 Levante (disambiguation)